Chicken katsu, also known as panko chicken, or tori katsu is a Japanese dish of fried chicken made with panko bread crumbs which is also popular in Italy, Hawaii, London, California, and other areas of the world.

Chicken katsu is generally served with tonkatsu sauce , a thick Japanese vegetarian pureed fruit-based brown sauce, or a well-seasoned ketchup, as a Hawaiian mixed plate lunch meal. It is generally served with shredded cabbage, rice or miso soup as part of a two or three item combo, or as a dinner with rice and vegetables.

In Hawaii, chicken katsu is as common as tonkatsu (pork cutlets). It is also served in place of tonkatsu in katsu curry and katsudon in local plate-lunch restaurants and in fine-dining Japanese establishments alike. It is often served in the form of a sandwich with "tonkatsu sauce".

Etymology
The name chicken katsu includes Japanese katsu, which is a shortened form of katsuretsu, meaning "cutlet".

Variations 

In the US, there are generally three different variations of katsu chicken:

 A panko-breaded chicken thigh, usually butterfried, sliced into bite-sized pieces or strips. It is typically salted, seasoned with black-or-white-pepper, dredged in a lightly seasoned flour, dipped in an egg beaten with some mirin, coated in  panko, then deep fried.
 A pounded chicken breast sliced into tenders. It is dredged in a lightly seasoned flour, dipped in lightly seasoned beaten egg, coated with lightly seasoned panko, then pan-fried.
 A variant of the chicken tender recipe, not pounded as thinly, commonly referred to as panko chicken (though any variation of katsu chicken can be called this).

In the United Kingdom, the word "katsu" has become synonymous with Japanese curry sauce rather than breaded meat cutlets.

See also 
 Japanese cuisine
 List of chicken dishes

References 

Japanese chicken dishes
Japanese cuisine
Deep fried foods
Breaded cutlets
Fried chicken